Khisa is a 2020 Marathi language short film directed by Raj Pritam More with Kailash Waghmare, Meenakasi Rathod, Shruti Madhudeep, Sheshpal Ganvir, Vedant Shrisagar the lead roles. The movie is official selected at 51st International Film Festival of India.

Cast
 Kailash Waghmare 
 Meenakasi Rathod 
 Shruti Madhudeep 
 Dr Sheshpal Ganvir
 Vedant Shrisagar

Awards and nominations
 Official selection at 51st Indian International Film Festival 2021
 Official selection at Montreal Independent Film Festival Canada 2020 and  26th (KIFF) Kolkata International Film Festival 2020.
 Official Selection at Dioroma International film festival  2020.
 Official Selection at (Jiff) Jaipur international film festival 2020.
 Official Selection at Singapore international film festival 2020.  
 Official Selection at Dublin International FIlm Festival 
 Official Selection at Mumbai International Cult FIlm Festival
 Official Selection at Dioroma Indie Shorts Awards Buenos Aires, Argentina 2021.

References

External links
 
 Khisa at Filmfreeway

2020s Marathi-language films
2020 films
Indian short films
2020 short films